Zippelius is a surname. Notable people with the surname include:

Alexander Zippelius (1797–1828), Dutch horticulturalist and botanical collector
Annette Zippelius (born 1949), German physicist
Reinhold Zippelius (born 1928), German jurist